Transistor Sound & Lighting Co. was an indie rock band from Winnipeg, Manitoba, Canada. The group was active from 1996 to 2000.

History
The band formed in 1996, performing shows and distributing cassette tapes of early song demos. They were signed to the Canadian arm of Sony Records, ViK. Recordings, releasing an ep of early mixes, and an eponymous album in 1998. The band toured North America opening for many different bands . They were hired by Emm Gryner to record some versions of Summerlong, as well as Phonecall 45 from her major label debut Public, for a special 12" release. In the course of record label reorganization, they left the label.

Band members
 Jason Churko - guitar, bass, drum, keyboards, noises, vocals
 Dino D'Ottavio - guitar, bass, drums, keyboards, synths ,percussion

References

External links 
 Transistor Sound & Lighting Co. on Myspace

Musical groups established in 1996
Musical groups disestablished in 2000
Musical groups from Winnipeg
Canadian indie rock groups
1996 establishments in Manitoba
2000 disestablishments in Canada